Belling the Cat is a 2014 Vietnamese animated film, directed by Lê Bình. The plot is based on the Aesop's fable Belling the cat.

Award
 Silver Kite prize – Vietnam Film Festival XIX (2015)

References

Vietnamese animated films
Vietnamese computer-animated films
Films based on fairy tales
2014 animated films
2014 films